Dhab Dhani is a village in the Bhiwani district of the Indian state of Haryana. , the village had 522 households with a total population of 2,954 of which 1,564 were male and 1,390 female. Nearby villages include Kairu, Dhigawa mandi, Dewrala and Jui Khurd.

Education
There is one government senior secondary school/primary school and two other Private schools.1.M.D.S Vidya Niketan.

References

Villages in Bhiwani district